Rushdown is a sports video game developed and published by Canal+Multimédia and Electronic Arts for PlayStation in 1999.

Reception

The game received unfavorable reviews according to the review aggregation website GameRankings.

References

External links
 Official website

1999 video games
Cycling video games
Electronic Arts games
Extreme sports video games
Infogrames games
Multiplayer and single-player video games
PlayStation (console) games
PlayStation (console)-only games
Snowboarding video games
Video games developed in France